Mecometopus palmatus is a species of beetle in the family Cerambycidae. It was described by Guillaume-Antoine Olivier in 1795.

References

Mecometopus
Beetles described in 1795